Pamela Suzette DeCosta (born August 27, 1964) was an American college basketball coach, most recently as a women's basketball assistant coach at Oklahoma. Born in Denver, DeCosta played college basketball at Mesa State College and received her bachelor's degree at Metropolitan State University of Denver in 1991.

Head coaching record

References

External links
Oklahoma bio
San Jose State bio (pp. 6-7)

1964 births
Living people
Oklahoma Sooners women's basketball coaches
American expatriate basketball people in Germany
Sportspeople from Denver
Colorado Mesa University alumni
Metropolitan State University of Denver alumni
Kansas Jayhawks women's basketball coaches
San Jose State Spartans women's basketball coaches
High school basketball coaches in the United States
American women's basketball coaches
Basketball coaches from Colorado
Metro State Roadrunners women's basketball coaches